Clayton Historic District is a national historic district located at Clayton, Johnston County, North Carolina.  It encompasses 271 contributing buildings, 2 contributing sites, and 1 contributing structures in the town of Clayton.  It includes notable examples of Late Victorian and Bungalow / American Craftsman style architecture and buildings dating from about 1850 to 1959. It includes commercial, residential, ecclesiastical, and educational structures. Located in the district are the separately listed Clayton Banking Company Building and the Clayton Graded School and Clayton Grammar School-Municipal Auditorium.  Other notable buildings include the B.M. Robertson Mule Company stable, Mayo House, the Young House, Horne Memorial United Methodist Church, First Baptist Church of Clayton, and First Missionary Baptist Church.

It was listed on the National Register of Historic Places in 2010.

References

Historic districts on the National Register of Historic Places in North Carolina
Victorian architecture in North Carolina
Buildings and structures in Johnston County, North Carolina
National Register of Historic Places in Johnston County, North Carolina